James Anthony Stodart, Baron Stodart of Leaston PC (6 June 1916 – 31 May 2003) was a Scottish Conservative politician.

The son of a colonel in the Indian medical service, he took over the family farm at Kingston, North Berwick, East Lothian, after his father died when he was just eighteen years old.

Although he was an active Unionist in his youth, he fell out with the party and joined the Liberal Party, standing as their candidate in Berwick and East Lothian at the 1950 general election.

By the following year, Stodart had returned to the Tory fold and was Unionist candidate for Midlothian and Peebles at the 1951 snap election and for Midlothian in 1955.

At the 1959 general election, he was elected as Member of Parliament (MP) for Edinburgh West, which he held until the October 1974 general election, when he was succeeded by fellow Conservative Lord James Douglas-Hamilton.

Stodart served as a junior Scottish Office Minister under Sir Alec Douglas-Home from 1963 to 1964, and at the Ministry of Agriculture under the leadership of Edward Heath, from 1970 to 1974.

After leaving the House of Commons, he became chairman of the Agriculture Credit Corporation from 1975 to 1987 and chaired an inquiry into Scottish local government in 1980. He was created a life peer as Baron Stodart of Leaston, of Humbie in the District of East Lothian on 1 June 1981.

His wife Hazel died in 1995. They had no children.

References

External links 
 

1916 births
2003 deaths
Stodart of Leaston
Liberal Party (UK) parliamentary candidates
Members of the Parliament of the United Kingdom for Edinburgh constituencies
Members of the Privy Council of the United Kingdom
Ministers in the Macmillan and Douglas-Home governments, 1957–1964
People educated at Wellington College, Berkshire
Politicians from Edinburgh
People from Midlothian
People from North Berwick
People from the Scottish Borders
Scottish Conservative Party MPs
Scottish Liberal Party parliamentary candidates
UK MPs 1959–1964
UK MPs 1964–1966
UK MPs 1966–1970
UK MPs 1970–1974
UK MPs 1974
Unionist Party (Scotland) MPs
Life peers created by Elizabeth II